In restaurants, à la carte is the practice of ordering individual dishes from a menu in a restaurant, as opposed to table d'hôte, where a set menu is offered. It is an early 19th century loan from French meaning "according to the menu".

The individual dishes to be ordered may include side dishes, or the side dishes may be offered separately, in which case, they are also considered à la carte.

History
The earliest examples of à la carte are from 1816 for the adjectival use ("à la carte meal", for example) and from 1821 for the adverbial use ("meals were served à la carte"). These pre-date the use of the word menu, which came into English in the 1830s.

See also 
 Omakase, Japanese expression for letting the chef decide
 Table d'hôte, the opposite of à la carte
 Buffet
 List of French words and phrases used by English speakers
 Pro rata, a method of billing or other calculation based on proportional usage

References

Bibliography
 
 Committee on Nutrition Standards for Foods in Schools, Food and Nutrition Board, Institute of Medicine (2007). Nutrition Standards for Foods in Schools. National Academies Press. page 83.
 Mosimann, Anton (1983). Cuisine à la carte. Macmillan Publishers Limited. 304 pages.

External links 

Restaurant menus